Preslav Yordanov (born 21 July 1989 in Pleven) is a Bulgarian footballer who currently plays as a forward for Pirin Blagoevgrad.

Career

Spartak Pleven
Yordanov started his career as a forward for Spartak Pleven during the 2006–07 season. He made his professional debut on 23 September 2006 in the West B PFG match against Hebar Pazardzhik at the age of 17.

Lokomotiv Sofia
In May 2007, Yordanov was confirmed to have signed a deal with A PFG side Lokomotiv Sofia, but for the 2007–08 season he was loaned out to Lokomotiv Mezdra and Spartak Pleven. On 5 March 2008, he scored his first hat-trick in his career, scoring four in a 5–3 win over Akademik Sofia.

Yordanov returned to Lokomotiv Sofia for the 2008–09 season, playing for the reserves. On 23 January 2009, Belasitsa Petrich confirmed Preslav has joined on loan until the end of the season. He earned 10 appearances playing in the A PFG, scoring three goals.

Yordanov made his competitive debut for Lokomotiv Sofia during the 2009–10 season, on 14 August 2009, in a 3–2 home win over Sportist Svoge, coming on as a substitute for Kristian Dobrev. He scored his first goal a year later, on 9 August 2010, in a 3–1 away loss against Levski Sofia.

On 21 July 2011, Yordanov scored his first ever European goals, netting twice in a 3–2 home win over Metalurg Skopje in the second qualifying round of 2011–12 Europa League and helped his team advance to the next stage. He left the club in December due to financial problems.

Chernomorets Burgas
On 4 December 2011, it was announced that Preslav Yordanov had signed with Chernomorets Burgas and will join his new club in January 2012. Yordanov impressed during Chernomorets' preseason campaign, netting 9 goals in 11 friendly matches. He debuted in the 2:0 home win against CSKA Sofia on 4 March 2012, playing the full 90 minutes. Yordanov scored for the first time in an official match on 21 March 2012, netting a last-minute goal in an away A PFG match against Kaliakra Kavarna to seal a 4:0 win.

On 13 December 2012 he was arrested for match-fixing. Yordanov was subsequently released without any charges pressed against him.

CSKA Sofia
Yordanov joined CSKA Sofia in the summer 2015, quickly establishing himself as an influential player for the team, being the club's second highest goalscorer in all competitions, finding the net on 33 occasions.

Ordabasy
On 15 February 2017, CSKA Sofia sold Yordanov to Kazakh club Ordabasy for an undisclosed fee.

Pirin Blagoevgrad
Yordanov returned to Bulgaria in March 2018, joining Pirin Blagoevgrad.

Septemvri Sofia
He was part of the Septemvri Sofia team between December 2018 and May 2020.

Pirin Blagoevgrad (2nd stint)
Yordanov rejoined Pirin Blagoevgrad in May 2020, signing a 2-year contract.

International career

Yordanov has been capped for various Bulgaria youth teams. He was called up to the senior Bulgaria squad by Ivaylo Petev for a 2018 FIFA World Cup qualifier against Luxembourg in September 2016, but had to withdraw due to sustaining an injury. On 13 November 2016, Yordanov earned his first cap for Bulgaria under new manager Petar Houbchev, coming on as a second-half substitute for Ivelin Popov in the 1:0 win over Belarus in a 2018 World Cup qualifier.

Career statistics
Updated 3 May 2016

Honours

Club
CSKA Sofia
 Bulgarian Cup: 2015–16

References

External sources
 

1989 births
Living people
Bulgarian footballers
Bulgarian expatriate footballers
Bulgarian expatriate sportspeople in Kazakhstan
Expatriate footballers in Kazakhstan
First Professional Football League (Bulgaria) players
PFC Spartak Pleven players
PFC Lokomotiv Mezdra players
FC Lokomotiv 1929 Sofia players
PFC Belasitsa Petrich players
PFC Chernomorets Burgas players
PFC CSKA Sofia players
OFC Pirin Blagoevgrad players
FC Septemvri Sofia players
Kazakhstan Premier League players
FC Ordabasy players
Association football forwards
Sportspeople from Pleven